= Woman's Hearts =

- Italian: Corazones de mujer
- Directed by: Davide Sordella, Pablo Benedetti
- Screenplay by: Davide Sordella, Pablo Benedetti
- Produced by: 011 Films
- Cinematography: Pablo Benedetti
- Edited by: Davide Sordella
- Music by: Enrico Sabena
- Release date: 2008
- Running time: 85 minutes
- Countries: Italy; Morocco

Woman's Hearts (Italian: Corazones de mujer) is a 2008 film.

== Synopsis ==
Once upon a time there was the best Arabic dressmaker of the city: his name was Shakira, he was a travestite and he had to make her wedding gown to Zina, a fiancée just about to get married. But she wasn't a virgin, something inconceivable in the Arab world. To get back to zero miles, they get into an old Alfa Romeo in Turin and head towards Morocco. And that's how the journey that will save their lives starts.
